Games of Love and Loneliness is a 1977 Swedish drama film directed by Anja Breien. Lil Terselius won the award for Best Actress at the 14th Guldbagge Awards. It is based on the 1912 novel The Serious Game by Hjalmar Söderberg.

Cast
 Lil Terselius as Lydia Stille
 Stefan Ekman as Arvid Stjärnblom
 Katarina Gustafsson as Dagmar Randel
 Chatarina Larsson as Marta Brehm
 Birgitta Andersson as Hilma Randel
 Hans Alfredson as Freutiger
 Allan Edwall as Markel
 Ernst Günther as Jacob Randel
 Peter Schildt as Lidner
 Stig Ossian Ericson as Rissler
 Palle Granditsky as Anders Stille
 Erland Josephson as Doncker

References

External links
 
 

1977 films
1977 drama films
Swedish drama films
1970s Swedish-language films
Films directed by Anja Breien
Films based on Swedish novels
Remakes of Swedish films
1970s Swedish films